Bhattanagar is a neighbourhood of West Liluah in Howrah city of Howrah district in the Indian state of West Bengal. It is part of Kolkata Metropolitan Development Authority (KMDA).

Bhattanagar is under the jurisdiction of Liluah police station of Howrah City Police.

Location
Bhattanagar is approximately 2.5 km from Liluah railway station, 7 km from Howrah Station and 8 km from Kolkata.
The place is mostly rural and has no hospital.

Education
One of the oldest schools of Howrah district, Bhattanagar Kulakamini Vidyamandir, is located there. Other educational institutions include the Don Bosco Self Employment Research Institute.

Economy 
Two banks are available there: Co-operative Bank and State Bank of India.

Culture 
Ramkrishna Sangha Club is a distinguished sports club established in 1977. The club organizes the annual Durga Puja since 1986. It also organizes cultural programmes and events. Bhattanagar Netaji Sangha club organizes Kali puja since the 1950s.

Transport

Bus
 39 Bhattanagar - Esplanade

Train
Bhattanagar railway station sits on its western side. The station is mainly used by freight trains. Passengers embark at Liluah railway station, approximately 2.5 km away.

References 

Cities and towns in Howrah district
Neighbourhoods in Howrah
Neighbourhoods in Kolkata
Kolkata Metropolitan Area